The Serpent was a 1916 American silent drama film directed by Raoul Walsh and starring Theda Bara. The film based on the short story "The Wolf's Claw", by Philip Bartholomae, and its scenario was written by Raoul A. Walsh. Produced and distributed by Fox Film Corporation, The Serpent was shot on location at Chimney Rock, North Carolina, and at the Fox Studio in Fort Lee, New Jersey. It is now considered lost.

Plot
As described in a film magazine review, after Vania Lazar is betrayed and debauched by Grand Duke Valanoff, she leaves Russia with no thought except to prey upon the sex that has made her what she is. Then comes the war, and she sees wounded Russians being taken to the hospital. In one room, she finds Prince Valanoff, the son of her betrayer, and with her wiles she wins his love and then his name. When the Grand Duke comes to visit, his son the Prince is absent. Not recognizing the new Vania, the Grand Duke responds to her lure, and the son discovers his own father as the betrayer of his happiness.

Cast
 Theda Bara as Vania Lazar
 James A. Marcus as Ivan Lazar
 Lillian Hathaway as Martsa Lazar
 Charles Craig as Grand Duke Valanoff
 Carl Harbaugh as Prince Valanoff
 George Walsh as Andrey Sobi
 Nan Carter as Ema Lachno
 Marcel Morhange as Gregoire
 Bernard Nedell

See also
List of lost films
1937 Fox vault fire

References

External links

1916 films
1916 drama films
1916 lost films
Fox Film films
Silent American drama films
American silent feature films
American black-and-white films
Films based on short fiction
Films directed by Raoul Walsh
Films shot in Fort Lee, New Jersey
Lost American films
Lost drama films
1910s American films
1910s English-language films